Osama Jamil Ali (born December 23, 1965) is a Kurdish politician, writer, actor and director.

From 1994 to 2000, he was the director of Kurdistan Islamic Union's media wing. From 2010 to 2014, he was a member of the Iraqi parliament on the list of the Kurdistan Islamic Union. He has previously worked as an actor, writer and director. In 2002, he appeared in the television series Mami Alan as Mir Izin. Osama is the son of Jamil Ali, a well-known Islamic figure among Kurds.

References 

Kurdish Islamists
Kurdistan Islamic Union politicians
Living people
1965 births

ckb:ئوسامە جەمیل